Wilhelm Lehmann was a German teacher and writer.

References 

 
 
 
 
 
 

German writers